The Europe/Africa Zone was one of the three zones of the regional Davis Cup competition in 1997.

In the Europe/Africa Zone there were four different tiers, called groups, in which teams competed against each other to advance to the upper tier. The top two teams in Europe/Africa IV advanced to the Europe/Africa Zone Group III in 1998. All other teams remained in Group IV.

Participating nations

Draw
 Venue: Field Club, Nicosia, Cyprus
 Date: 21–25 May

  and  promoted to Group III in 1998.

Results

Cyprus vs. Congo

Azerbaijan vs. Zambia

Benin vs. Tunisia

Cyprus vs. Zambia

Azerbaijan vs. Tunisia

Benin vs. Congo

Cyprus vs. Azerbaijan

Benin vs. Zambia

Congo vs. Tunisia

Cyprus vs. Benin

Azerbaijan vs. Congo

Tunisia vs. Zambia

Cyprus vs. Tunisia

Azerbaijan vs. Benin

Congo vs. Zambia

References

External links
Davis Cup official website

Davis Cup Europe/Africa Zone
Europe Africa Zone Group IV